National Highway 361B, commonly referred to as NH 361B, is a national highway in  India. It is a spur road of National Highway 61. NH-361B traverses the state of Maharashtra in India.

Route 

Kalamb - Ralegaon - Kapsi - Sirasgaon - Vadner - Wadki.

Junctions  
 
  Terminal near Kalamb.
  Terminal near Wadki.

See also 

 List of National Highways in India
 List of National Highways in India by state

References

External links 

 NH 361B on OpenStreetMap

National highways in India
National Highways in Maharashtra